Up Against the Wall may refer to:

 "Up Against the Wall", a song on Tom Robinson Band's 1978 album Power in the Darkness
 "Up Against the Wall", a song on Boys Like Girls' 2006 self-titled debut album
 Up Against the Wall Motherfucker, 1960s New York-based anarchist affinity group